The term comrade generally means 'mate', 'colleague', or 'ally', and derives from the Spanish and Portuguese, term , literally meaning 'chamber mate', from Latin , meaning 'chamber' or 'room'. It may also specifically mean "fellow soldier". Political use of the term was inspired by the French Revolution, after which it grew into a form of address between socialists and workers. Since the Russian Revolution, popular culture in the Western world has often associated it with communism.

Background 

When the socialist movement gained momentum in the mid-19th century, socialists elsewhere began to look for a similar egalitarian alternative to terms like "Mister", "Miss", or "Missus". In German, the word  had long been used as an affectionate form of address among people linked by some strong common interest, such as a sport, a college, a profession (notably as a soldier), or simply friendship. The term was often used with political overtones in the revolutions of 1848, and was subsequently borrowed by French and English. In English, the first known use of the word comrade with this meaning was in 1884 in the socialist magazine Justice.

Russo-Soviet usage 
After the Russian Revolution, translations of the term in different languages were adopted by communists worldwide. However, due to its common usage in portrayals of the Soviet Union in Cold War films and books, the term became most strongly associated in public consciousness with communism as known in the Soviet Union, even though many other socialists would continue to use Comrade among themselves (e.g., German and Austrian social-democrats and, to this day, left wing members of the British Labour Party).

In the early years of Soviet power, the Bolsheviks used  when addressing or referring to people assumed sympathetic to the revolution and to the Soviet state, such as members of the Communist party (and originally of other pro-revolution leftist formations such as the Left Socialist-Revolutionaries) and people from the "working masses". The more neutral republican form of address would translate as Citizen. Accordingly, supporters of the White movement in the Russian Civil War would use  mockingly as a derogatory term for their enemies – although at the same time, the various socialist anti-Bolshevik forces such as the Socialist Revolutionary Party and the Mensheviks also used  among themselves.

By the mid-1920s, the form of address  became so commonplace in the Soviet Union that it was used indiscriminately in essentially the same way as terms like "Mister" and "Sir" are employed in English. That use persisted until the dissolution of the Soviet Union.

The term  (Comrade) is still the standard form of address in the Russian Armed Forces and Police of Russia, where officers and soldiers are normally addressed as  Colonel,  General,  Sergeant, or the like.

Chinese usage 

It was first introduced in the political sense by Sun Yat-sen to refer to his followers. The  (Nationalist Party), which was co-founded by Sun Yat-Sen, has a long tradition of using this term to refer to its members, usually as a noun rather than a title; for example, a KMT member would say "Mr. Chang is a loyal and reliable comrade."

Nevertheless, the term was promoted most actively by the Chinese Communist Party during its struggle for power. It was used both as a noun and as a title for basically anyone in mainland China after the People's Republic of China was founded. However, after the 1980s and the onset of China's market-oriented reforms, this term has been moving out of such daily usage. It remains in use as a respectful term of public address among middle-aged Chinese and members of the Chinese Communist Party.

At party or civil meetings, the usage of the term has been retained. In addition,  is the term of preference to address any national leader when their titles are not attached (e.g., Comrade Mao Zedong, Comrade Deng Xiaoping).

In October 2016, the Central Committee of the Chinese Communist Party issued a directive urging all 90 million party members to keep calling each other "comrades" instead of less egalitarian terms. It is also in the regulations of the Chinese Armed Forces as one of three appropriate ways to formally address another member of the military ("comrade" plus rank or position, as in "Comrade Colonel", or simply "comrade/s" when lacking information about the person's rank, or talking to several servicepeople.)

The SAR territories of Hong Kong and Macau generally use  as a catch-all term to refer to members of the LGBT community; its use as a word for "comrade" has historically been uncommon due to both territories formerly being under foreign administrations.

South African usage 

During the 1970s and 1980s, comrade emerged as a popular revolutionary form of address in South Africa among those involved in anti-apartheid political activities. For example, members of the African National Congress and South African Communist Party frequently referred to each other as comrade.

Among poor residents of the country's segregated townships, it was also used to specifically denote members of militant youth organisations. These radical activists led consumer boycotts, organised anti-apartheid rallies and demonstrations, and intimidated those suspected of having ties to the South African government or security forces. In this particular context, the English title comrades was also used interchangeably with the Xhosa term .

Zimbabwean usage 

In Zimbabwe, the term is used for persons affiliated with the ZANU–PF political party. The state media also use Cde as short for comrade. Members of other political parties mainly the Movement for Democratic Change are often referred by their names or Mr, Mrs or Prof.

The revived Zimbabwe African People's Union (ZAPU) members also call themselves comrades.

South Sudanese usage 
Members of the Sudan People's Liberation Army call each other 'Comrade'.

British usage 
The British Union of Fascists used the word commonly to refer to members. The Marching Song, set to the music of the  began 'Comrades, the voices'. The writer, E.D. Randall, defended the usage of the word by stating that 'comrades' ‘fittingly and completely expresses the ideal of unity in the service of a common cause’

In other languages 
In Albanian, the word  (meaning friend, from Latin ) was used within communist circles.
In Ethiopia the Amharic word for "comrade" is "Guade" written with ancient Geez script as "ጓድ". The word "Guade" trace its origin to the Amharic word of "Guadegna/ ጓደኛ" meaning " a friend". The word was in popular use after the 1974 revolution particularly by members of the socialist party to refer to another person of the similar political group, belongs to the same ideology, or similar style. The usage of the word is eroded since 1991 and it is limited to political party conventions or meetings. A rather the most popular variation of the word in the past and currently is "Guadochae/ ጓዶቼ" meaning "my friends" which is a humble way of address for a valued colleague or friend.
The Arabic word  (meaning comrade, companion) is used in Arabic, Urdu and Persian with the same political connotation as "comrade." The term is used both among Arab communists as well as within the Ba'ath movement and the Lebanese Forces. The term predates modern political usage, and is an Arabic male proper name. Iranian communists use the same term. In Pakistan, the term is sometimes used to refer to Islamist members of Jamaat-e-Islami and Islami Jamiat-e-Talaba (the student wing of Jamaat-e-Islami).
This word literally translates as 'friend'. It is used by members of the Armenian Revolutionary Federation, Ramgavar and Social Democrat Hunchakian Party when addressing other members of the party. The term is also used by the Armenian Communist Party.
It is usually used only with a political or historical meaning in connection with the Communists.
The Bengali word  is used by all leftist groups especially by the Communist Party of Bangladesh, Communist Party of India, Communist Party of India (Marxist) and other Communist Parties in India (especially in the States of West Bengal and Tripura) and Socialist Party of Bangladesh-SPB, Jatiyo Samajtantrik Dal-JSD (Bangladesh) etc.
The Burmese word  is used in the Communist Party of Burma.
It translates as friend or colleague. In Communist times, it was the general form of address, also used in reference to schoolteachers etc.
It is still in widespread use among communist and anarchist organisations, but it also occurs often in everyday speech to refer to neutral relationships such as classmates or flatmates with no political connotation.
In Chinese, the word  is used. The meaning of the word refers to a like-minded person. It is, through usage, associated with Communism, however, it may be used as a friendly epithet between friends or colleagues, mostly of the older generation. It is still currently used in Chinese state media to address top party and state leaders such as Xi Jinping as well as within the People’s Liberation Army to address soldiers and officers.
In 19th century Czech, it was a poetic word, meaning 'fellow'. As elsewhere in Europe, the term was originally introduced by the Czech Social Democrats and subsequently carried over to Czech Communists as well when these split off from the Social Democrats. After the Communist Party gained power in 1948, the word displaced all prior titles like ,  ("Mister", "Madam") and became the title used generally for everyone. Nowadays, it is used only in (actual or, more often, ironic) Communist context. A cognate to English word 'comrade', means "friend" in Czech. It is a very commonly used word and it has no political connotations. "Jesus's Journeymen").
In Common Dutch the word is mostly reminiscent of communists, whereas in informal speech and dialects it can be used to indicate friends or acquaintances. It was used as a form of address in the Communist Party of the Netherlands, as well as in the pre-war National Socialist Movement in the Netherlands, the latter also using the female neologism . The pseudo-Russian word  is used informally as a sobriquet for a person with leftist sympathies.
The Esperanto word for comrade is  either in the sense of a friend or a political fellow-traveller. The word , literally "same-thinker", usually refers to a fellow Esperantist.
Having initially a neutral meaning, the term was later adapted by local communists. Today it has an ironical meaning, referring to Soviet times.
This has a heavy socialist connotation, but may sometimes be used in humorous manner. Mates in an institution like school, jail or hospital could also be addressed thus, but not in the army.
It is mainly used by communists and can apply to classmates or friends.
The meaning is that of a fellow, a companion or an associate. Since Kamerad is the usual term for a fellow soldier in German military language, the word is associated with right-wing rather than left-wing groups. Communists and socialists, especially party members of the SED and SPD use the word  (fem. ; i.e. "partner", in the sense of a fellow member of a co-operative) with the socialist association that 'comrade' has in English.. The members of the Nazi party NSDAP used the variant Parteigenosse (lit. party-comrade).
Other meanings of this word are: mate, pal, friend, companion, even partner or associate etc.
During the time of Socialist Zionist political and ideological dominance of the 1930s to the 1960s, the word in a sense similar to English "comrade" was in widespread use, in the Kibbutz movement, the Histadrut trade unions, the driver-owned bus companies etc. At present, its political use is considered old-fashioned, mainly restricted to Israeli Communists; the same word exists also in Yiddish, which is one possible origin of the colloquial Australian word cobber.) The Hebrew  and the female  are still widely used in a non-political sense, as meaning simply 'friend' (in certain contexts also meaning 'boyfriend'/'girlfriend').
 The Hindi equivalent for comrade is kaamred (कामरेड) or saathi (साथी). It is widely used among leftist (communist) parties of India, e.g., Communist Party of India, Communist Party of India (Marxist), Revolutionary Socialist Party (India), Forward Bloc and others.
As the Hungarian Working People's Party gradually gained power after the Second World War, the word displaced all prior titles like  ("Mister") and became the title used generally for everyone except for people who were obviously not "tenet fellows" e.g. those who committed political crime against the socialist state. After the democratic transition the word became obsolete and it is used derogatorily to address politicians on the political left.
It is also the word used for a "member" of club or association. When used as a title to precede a name (i.e.,  or ) it has a communist implication.
Both expressions are used largely by Irish Republicans, Nationalism, Communists, and Socialists.
This word is in widespread use among left-wing circles, including not just communists but also many socialists. Using one word or the other is a quick way to announce one's political views.
The word is used to refer to like-minded persons and the usage is not necessarily limited to Communists, though the word is to some extent associated with Communism. The word should not be confused with a homonym , which is a more commonly used postfix to show people sharing a certain property.
In Kannada, the word ,  is used among communist people's while addressing its people.
In Kazakh, the translation of "tovarish" was similar to other Turkic translations,   (literally "co-traveller", most often used referring to friends and spouses) was used.
In Khmer, the word comrade was used by members of the Khmer Rouge during the communist rule of Pol Pot in 1975–1979 and by the Kampuchean United Front for National Salvation during the People's Republic of Kampuchea era. 
Although the word was originally used by Korean people all over the Korean Peninsula, people living south of the 38th Parallel began avoiding using the word after a communist state was set up in the north. In North Korea, the word  replaced all prior social titles and earned a new meaning as "a fellow man fighting for the revolution". The word originally meant “friend”. On the other hand, the word  is frequently used in North Korean state media to address senior state and party leaders such as Kim Jong-un. 
In Kurdish, the word  ("friend" or "companion on a long journey") is widely used among Kurdish political parties and organizations.
In Malayalam, the word  is used among communist organizations while addressing fellow members.
It is still in use but less than before.
It is used by communists in Nepal such as the Communist Party of Nepal (Maoist Centre), Communist Party of Nepal (Unified Marxist–Leninist), Janamorcha Nepal and others.
It can be associated with communist usage, but more commonly refers simply to an associate, a co-worker, or a classmate in school ( or ). In everyday use, the word  on its own is considered a masculine term, referring to boys/men. For girls/women, the term  (female form of  friend) is used instead.
In the Philippines, communist and left-leaning activists prefer the term  (roughly, companion), and the short form,  before the name (e.g. Ka Bel). Practitioners of law informally use the Spanish terms  and  when referring to each other, albeit without any socio-political connotation.
It is used by and refers to communists, socialists, or supporters of the communist system across the Durand Line (i.e. in Afghanistan and Pakistan) by Pashto speakers. For the last decade or so it has also been used by the nationalists. The word is also used by common people both male and female for a very close friend.
In non-political sense, it means "companion".
It is also prevalent in the army, and has been gaining popularity among nationalist movements. The term used among socialist activists nowadays tends to be  /  although in Portugal  is still commonly used. The terms  and / are also used without political connotations, meaning 'mate', 'partner', 'fella'.
However, the word "Comrade" itself, or ਕਾਮਰੇਡ, is used to refer to a communist or communist party member, and is often used as a more linguistically acceptable replacement for the word "communist," with the communist party often being called "The Comrades" or communist thought being called "Comrade Sochni."
During the communist era an older term, derived from a Slavic source, was used to convey the political meaning.
In the period between World War II and Josip Broz Tito's death in Socialist Yugoslavia, the leading Yugoslav Communist League promoted the use of the term between the members and generally among the society. Its intention was to emphasize empathy and equality, and it is still used by the most fervocious adherents of leftist ideologies.
The term  is used too, but it is normally translated as friend.
'comrade teacher'). After 1991 it rapidly fell out of use as a general term of address, but is still used when expressing comradeship among individuals.
It was widely used by the erstwhile Somali Revolutionary Socialist Party (1969-1991). The word fell out of use after the fall of the Somali Revolutionary Socialist Party.
In Spain, the word is  /  ('companion'); the term  ('comrade') has also been used, but it is more associated with the communist and Falange tradition. In Spain the word  can be (and often is) used with no political connotation.
The standard form in Cuba is  / , as it was in socialist Nicaragua and Chile. The term  is the more normal among Spanish Communists.
In Chile, much like as in Italy,  has traditionally been used by its army, and historically by fascist groups, such as the National Socialist Movement of Chile, while  is commonplace within far-left wing groups and the Socialist and Communist parties.
The word  is still used in formerly socialist Tanzania as a way of showing (political) solidarity.
Although it can be associated with communist usage, it can equally well refer simply to a friend, a co-worker, or a classmate in school ( or ). Unlike the corresponding Norwegian word, the term is commonly used for both boys and girls in non-communist usage. See also Idrottsföreningen Kamraterna
In Tetun, the national language of Timor Leste, the word  is used – a direct loan from the language of the former colonial power, Portugal. During the 1970s the word was a common term of address within the left-leaning Fretilin party, and after the Indonesian invasion, continued to be used by the Fretilin associated guerrillas waging a war of resistance in the jungle. Though largely falling out of use since 1999 Fretilin politicians and veterans of the guerrillas struggle continue to use the term to refer to each other.
The Thai word  was used in the communist movement.
The Turkish word  (literally 'co-traveller') has become used within the communist movement,  meaning 'way' and 'cause'. Turkish communists, being morally affected by Bektashi values of the older era, adopted this term. In the climate of harsh anticommunist repression the word largely disappeared from common usage.  is also a male name in Turkish.
In Ukraine comrade was still the standard form of address in the armed forces and police until October 2018, when it was changed into 'sir' by law.
In the United Kingdom, political use of the term comrade is strongly associated with both Communism and, historically, Fascism. However it is still used as an informal form of address among some Labour Party members, and in a more serious manner by many smaller parties of the left. Use of the term is generally restricted to people with whom the speaker agrees politically. It is usually written in full, the abbreviation Cde being associated with southern African usage. The honorific terms sister and brother, also declining in usage, are more politically inclusive, encompassing everyone from the centre-left to the far-left, without necessarily indicating complete political agreement. All three terms are occasionally used in a mocking or patronising manner by political opponents. On the far right, comrade was the standard form of address between members of the British Union of Fascists and featured widely in their publications and marching songs.
In the United States, the word comrade carries a strong connotation with Communism, Marxism–Leninism, and the former Soviet Union. Especially during the Cold War, to address someone as "comrade" marked either the speaker, person addressed, or both as suspected communist sympathizers. It is frequently used ironically in that way. In addition, it is still used in its generic context by some American socialists. Despite this, it has been adopted into the U.S. Army Soldier's Creed in the statement "I will never leave a fallen comrade". It is also used at meetings of the Veterans of Foreign Wars to address a fellow member.
Due to the influence of Chinese revolutionary groups during the early 20th century on the Vietnamese independence movement, its usage was first seen among members of the Kuomintang-backed Vietnamese Nationalist Party and then later spread to members of the Vietnamese Communist Party. It is still being used openly in public to address state and Communist Party leaders as well as among soldiers and military officers in the People's Army of Vietnam.

In popular culture 
In George Orwell's novel Animal Farm, the animals all refer to each other as comrade, as the story is a satirical look at the Russian Revolution. Also in Nineteen Eighty-Four, party members in Oceania refer to each other as comrade.

Alexander Pushkin's play Boris Godunov and subsequent opera have namedropping of "tovarishch", when two vagrant-monks reference the future False Dmitry I.

In Mobile Suit Gundam, citizens of the Principality of Zeon use "comrade" to refer to each other.

In My Hero Academia members of the Shie Hassaikai use "comrade" to refer to each other.

See also

References

External links 
 

Political terminology
Communist terminology
Socialism
Islamism